The Memphis Reds were a Minor League Baseball team that played in the Southern League in 1885. They were located in Memphis, Tennessee, and played their home games at Olympic Park. In 1877, a different team also called the Memphis Reds played in the League Alliance.

The Reds played their first game on April 15, losing to the Birmingham Coal Barons, 8–3, on the road. They ended the season in fifth place at 38–54 (.413).

In 1886, the city was represented in the Southern League by the Memphis Grays.

Notable players
Twenty-eight Reds also played in at least one game in Major League Baseball during their careers. These players were:

Tug Arundel
Frank Bell
Bob Black
Tommy Bond
Jack Brennan
Scrappy Carroll
Billy Colgan
Clarence Cross
Doug Crothers
Billy Crowell
Conny Doyle
Harry East
Bill Geiss
Bernie Graham
Bill Hart
Ducky Hemp
Mortimer Hogan
Tom Lee
Frank McLaughlin
Trick McSorley
Billy O'Brien
Tom O'Brien
Billy Palmer
Dick Phelan
John Richmond
Ted Sullivan
Lou Sylvester
Perry Werden

References

External links
Statistics from Baseball Reference
Statistics from Stats Crew

1885 establishments in Tennessee
1885 disestablishments in Tennessee
Baseball teams established in 1885
Baseball teams disestablished in 1885
Defunct baseball teams in Tennessee
Professional baseball teams in Tennessee
Southern League (1885–1899) teams
R